Jeffrey Leiwakabessy (born 23 February 1981) is a Dutch former professional footballer who played as a left back.

Club career
Born in Elst, Gelderland, Leiwakabessy played his first professional seasons with NEC Nijmegen. In 2006–07 he moved to Alemannia Aachen in Germany, which had just returned to the Bundesliga after a four-decade absence; during the campaign he appeared in all 34 league matches, but could not help prevent the team's immediate relegation.

After one more season in Aachen, Leiwakabessy joined Anorthosis Famagusta FC in the Cypriot First Division. He went on to feature in twelve 2008–09 UEFA Champions League games as the side overachieved in the group stage, even though it was eventually ousted as last.

On 4 January 2012, Leiwakabessy returned to his country and signed a one-year contract with VVV-Venlo in the Eredivisie. On 15 October of the following year, after a period of trial, he joined former club NEC until the end of the campaign.

Honours
NEC
Eerste Divisie: 2014–15

References

External links
Stats at Voetbal International 

1981 births
Living people
People from Overbetuwe
Dutch people of Indonesian descent
Dutch people of Moluccan descent
Dutch footballers
Association football defenders
Eredivisie players
Eerste Divisie players
NEC Nijmegen players
VVV-Venlo players
Bundesliga players
2. Bundesliga players
Alemannia Aachen players
Cypriot First Division players
Anorthosis Famagusta F.C. players
Netherlands youth international footballers
Dutch expatriate footballers
Expatriate footballers in Germany
Expatriate footballers in Cyprus
Dutch expatriate sportspeople in Germany
Dutch expatriate sportspeople in Cyprus
Footballers from Gelderland